Henry Javier Hernández (born 14 May 1982) is a Colombian professional footballer who plays as a forward for Deportes Quindío.

Career
In 2012, he was ranked by IFFHS as the third top goalscorer of the year behind Lionel Messi and Cristiano Ronaldo, scoring 35 goals in 45 matches with Guatemalan club Heredia.

References

External links 
 
 

1982 births
Living people
Colombian footballers
Colombian expatriate footballers
Categoría Primera A players
Categoría Primera B players
Cúcuta Deportivo footballers
Envigado F.C. players
Heredia Jaguares de Peten players
La Equidad footballers
Deportivo Pasto footballers
Boyacá Chicó F.C. footballers
Atlético Bucaramanga footballers
C.D.S. Vida players
Real Santander footballers
Deportes Quindío footballers
Association football forwards
Colombian expatriate sportspeople in Honduras
Colombian expatriate sportspeople in Guatemala
Expatriate footballers in Honduras
Expatriate footballers in Guatemala
People from Montería
20th-century Colombian people
21st-century Colombian people